Maliattha fervens is a moth of the family Noctuidae. It was described by George Hampson in 1906. It is found in Karnataka, India.

References

Eustrotiinae
Moths described in 1906